New Bedford is a village in Bureau County, Illinois, United States. The population was 76 at the 2020 census. It is part of the Ottawa Micropolitan Statistical Area.

History

In October 1836, Henry Thomas of West Bureau Township registered land at the narrows (now New Bedford) and for a number of years it was the only registered tract in that section of the county. In the spring of 1837, Cyrus Watson, the first settler on Green river, built a cabin on Thomas' land, believing it to be vacant. About this time a state road was laid from Princeton to Prophetstown on the Rock River, crossing the Green River at this point. Henry Thomas built a ferry boat, and for a number of years it was known as Thomas' Ferry.

Pic.1: Looking Northward from West side of Main Street.
Pic.2: Looking Northward from East side of Main Street. 
Pic.3: Looking Northward across the Green River bridge.  This section of the river is now called the Old Channel.
Pic.4: Looking Southward across the Green River bridge. Large house on right belonged to the Bollman family.
Pic.5: Spratt Department store on East side of Main street.  The cement step still remains, located across the street from the Post Office.
Pic.6: F. Janderson Department store on West side of Main street.

Geography

Demographics

As of the 2020 census there were 76 people, 32 households, and 18 families residing in the village. The racial makeup of the village was 94.74% White and 5.26% from two or more races. Hispanic or Latino of any race were 2.63% of the population.

There were 32 households, out of which 9.38% had children under the age of 18 living with them, 37.50% were married couples living together, 9.38% had a female householder with no husband present, and 43.75% were non-families. 40.63% of all households were made up of individuals, and 25.00% had someone living alone who was 65 years of age or older. The average household size was 2.22 and the average family size was 1.78.

The village's age distribution consisted of 8.8% under the age of 18, 14.0% from 18 to 24, 15.8% from 25 to 44, 15.8% from 45 to 64, and 45.6% who were 65 years of age or older. The median age was 59.5 years. For every 100 females, there were 111.1 males. For every 100 females age 18 and over, there were 92.6 males.

The median income for a household in the village was $47,500, and the median income for a family was $57,500. Males had a median income of $20,000 versus $41,250 for females. The per capita income for the village was $23,430. About 22.2% of families and 26.3% of the population were below the poverty line, including 80.0% of those under age 18 and 26.9% of those age 65 or over.

References

Villages in Bureau County, Illinois
Villages in Illinois
Ottawa, IL Micropolitan Statistical Area
Populated places established in 1837
1837 establishments in Illinois